= Selected papers series of Knuth =

Paper series writer by Donald Knuth

This is a list of Selected papers series: written by Donald Knuth

1. Donald Ervin Knuth (1992). Literate Programming. Stanford, California: Center for the Study of Language and Information. ISBN 0-937073-80-6.
2. Donald Ervin Knuth (1996). Selected Papers on Computer Science. Stanford, California: Center for the Study of Language and Information. ISBN 1-881526-91-7.
3. Donald Ervin Knuth (1999). Digital Typography. Stanford, California: Center for the Study of Language and Information. ISBN 1-57586-010-4.
4. Donald Ervin Knuth (2000). Selected Papers on Analysis of Algorithms. Stanford, California: Center for the Study of Language and Information. ISBN 1-57586-212-3.
5. Donald Ervin Knuth (2003). Selected Papers on Computer Languages. Stanford, California: Center for the Study of Language and Information. ISBN 1-57586-382-0.
6. Donald Ervin Knuth (2003). Selected Papers on Discrete Mathematics. Stanford, California: Center for the Study of Language and Information. ISBN 1-57586-248-4.
7. Donald Ervin Knuth (2010). Selected Papers on Design of Algorithms. Stanford, California: Center for the Study of Language and Information. ISBN 1-57586-582-3.
8. Donald Ervin Knuth (2011). Selected Papers on Fun and Games. Stanford, California: Center for the Study of Language and Information. ISBN 978-1-57586-584-3.
9. Donald Ervin Knuth (2011). Companion to the Papers of Donald Knuth. Stanford, California: Center for the Study of Language and Information. ISBN 978-1-57586-634-5.
